The Colombian Identity Card (also known as Cédula de ciudadanía) is an identity document issued to Colombian citizens by local registry offices in Colombia and diplomatic missions abroad to every Colombian person over 18 years of age, since for minors it is the "Tarjeta de Identidad.”  This is the only valid identification document for all civil, political, administrative and judicial acts according to Colombian Law 39 of 1961. They are produced and issued by the National Civil Registry.

History 
On November 24, 1952, the first Citizenship Certificate was issued to the then President of the Republic, Laureano Gómez Castro, with number 1. Later, in 1954, women were able to exercise the right to elect and be elected. The first female identity card was issued on May 25, 1956, to Doña Carola Correa de Rojas Pinilla, wife of the then President of Colombia, General Gustavo Rojas Pinilla, with number 20,000,001. This document is the so-called "Blanca Laminada.”

In 1993 a brown laminated identification card was produced. Information on the previous identification card such as skin color and signs is eliminated, and information on blood type, the citizen's sex and a barcode is added. Since May 2000, the identity document "Amarilla con hologramas" (yellow with holograms) has been produced, based on AFIS (Automated Fingerprint Identification Identification System) technology. Along with this format, two others circulated (white and brown), either of which was recognized as a legitimate means of citizen identification.

In 2003, the format of the PIN (Personal Identification Number) was changed. Previously, a person had an identity card number and was later assigned a different one upon turning 18. In the aforementioned year, an alphabetical complement to the identity card number began to be used. Later, in 2004, the NIP system was changed to the NUIP (Unique Personal Identity Number) that identifies a single citizen throughout their life; the numbering begins with the number 1.000.000.000. Citizens who were issued an identity card before 2003 kept the same number.

In 2005, and after a series of bureaucratic and technical problems, the National Registry of Civil Status of Colombia, through a decree, determined that as of January 1, 2010, the only valid identity document will be the one issued to from the year 2000, which was the yellow one with holograms. This date was later postponed to July 31, 2010.

In 2020, a new electronic identity document was announced, which began to be issued on December 1 of the same year. The document allows citizens to identify themselves and carry out procedures without the need for a physical document. The electronic document can be stored on any smartphone device through the National Civil Registry’s app, available on Android and iOS devices.

Obtaining a citizen card 
Colombian citizens can obtain a citizen card by presenting themselves at a Colombian registry or consular office with a previous form of identification, such as a birth certificate, letter of naturalization, resolution of registration if Colombian by adoption, or “tarjeta de identidad,” which is a form of identification given to minors. The person obtaining a citizenship card must be at least 18 years old. Other requirements include providing three 4 cm x 5 cm color photographs of the individual against a white background, however some registry offices within Colombia may not require this, and knowing your blood type and RH factor. If the individual is bald or has light-colored hair, the photos must be taken against a blue background. The service is free of charge if the individual is getting the citizen card for the first time. Those who request duplicates due to theft, incorrect information, loss or damage must provide the same information and also pay a fee of COP $55,750.

This document is mandatory for all Colombian citizens over 18 years of age who reside in Colombia and for those seeking consular assistance abroad.

After the procedure, a provisional document called “contraseña” (English: password) is delivered that has the citizen's photo, fingerprint, the name and the NUIP (unique personal identification number). The delivery time of the document varies, ranging from one to three months depending on the office where the procedure is done.

Military and police authorities may require the document. The national police code defines in article 35, literal 3 that: "The following behaviors affect the relationship between people and authorities and therefore should not be carried out. Its performance will give rise to corrective measures: (...) Prevent , hinder, hinder or resist the identification or individualization procedure, by the police authorities". A general fine of type 4 is imposed; participation in a community program or educational activity of coexistence. However, not carrying the document is not considered a crime.

International travel 
Holders of a Colombian identification document can enter without a passport in all member countries of the Union of South American Nations with the exception of Suriname, Guyana and Venezuela. This includes:

 (CAN):
 
 
 

 (Southern Common Market) Member and associated states:

Current identity card for adults

Electronic identity document (2020-present) 
The electronic identity card has been issued since December 2020, replacing the previous iteration which was yellow with holograms. It expires every 10 years.

This new form of identification can also be stored on any smartphone that runs on Android or iOS operating systems using the Registry’s app. It has the same validity as its physical counterpart.

Characteristics 
 Material: Polycarbonate
 Length: 5.5 cm
 Width: 8.8 cm

Front 

The header consists of the inscriptions "CÉDULA DE CIUDADANÍA" and "REPÚBLICA DE COLOMBIA,” a small Colombian flag, in the lower right corner there is a butterfly that changes color gold/green. The background, mainly yellow and sky blue, consists of geometric patterns with relief, curves, a book and thirteen butterflies. The following information is found.

 Photo of the person
 NUIP (Número Único de Identidad Personal / Unique Personal Identification Number)
 Last name(s)
 First name(s)
 Nationality
 Height
 Sex
 Photo window
 Date of birth
 Blood type and RH
 Place of birth
 Date and place of issue
 Signature
 Expiration date

Back 

The header consists of the inscription ".CO” which the domain name of the country. The background, mostly yellow and sky blue, consists of geometric patterns, curves, and the Iglesia de San Pedro Claver, Cartagena. On the back is the following information.

 Serial number
 Photo window
 Signature of the National Registry
 Biometric QR code
 Three-line data machine-readable zone with identification document number

Security measures 
Unlike the yellow with holograms card, this format does not include printing of the right index. However in order to be issued to Colombian citizens, fingerprints and biometric data is taken and stored.

The QR code uses ABIS (Automated Biometric Identification System - Sistema automático de identificación por biometrías) technology that allows government entities to verify the identity of the bearer of the document by accessing the citizen's biometric database.

Formats of previous identity documents

Yellow with holograms identity card (2000-2020) 
The yellow with holograms card was issued in May 2000, replacing all previous iterations of the document. Despite no longer being issued as of 2020, it is still considered a valid document. Unlike the electronic card, the yellow with holograms card has no expiration date.

Characteristics 
 Material: Plastic
 Length: 5.5 cm
 Width: 8.8 cm

Front 

The header consists of the inscriptions "REPÚBLICA DE COLOMBIA,” "IDENTIFICACIÓN PERSONAL" and "CÉDULA DE CIUDADANÍA.” The background, mostly yellow, with gray and pink, consists of curved patterns and the country's coat of arms inscribed in a circle; it has holograms that show the emblem of the registry and the phrase "REPÚBLICA DE COLOMBIA.” On the front face you will find the following information.

 Photo of the person
 NUIP (Número Único de Identidad Personal / Unique Personal Identification Number)
 Last name(s)
 First name(s)
 Electronic signature

Back 

It has no header. The background, mostly yellow and pink, consists of curved patterns, and the Registrar's emblem inscribed in a white circle. On the back is the following information.

 Fingerprint of the right index finger
 Date of birth
 Place of birth
 Height
 Blood type and RH
 Sex
 Date and place of issue
 Signature of the National Registry
 Bar matrix with citizen information

Biometrics 
This format includes printing of the right index. However, in order to be issued to Colombian citizens, fingerprints and biometric data are taken and stored.

The matrix uses AFIS (Automated Fingerprint Identification System) technology that allows government entities to verify the identity of the bearer of the card by comparing the citizen's fingerprints.

Brown laminated identity card (1993-2000) 
The brown laminated identity card, which was first issued since 1993, stopped being produced in 2000 when the yellow with holograms card was introduced. The brown laminated card has not been valid since August 1, 2010.

Characteristics 
 Material: Plastic
 Length: 5.5 cm
 Width: 8.8 cm

Front 

The header consists of the inscriptions "REPÚBLICA DE COLOMBIA,” "IDENTIFICACIÓN PERSONAL" and "CÉDULA DE CIUDADANÍA.” The background is white and consists of brown patterns and the coat of arms of the country with ornaments. It obtains the following information:

 Black and white photo of the person
 NUIP (Número Único de Identidad Personal / Unique Personal Identification Number)
 Last name(s)
 First name(s)
 Signature of cardholder

Back 
It has no header. The background is white and consists of a brown pattern, and the emblem of the Registrar's Office is inscribed in a white circle. On the back is the following information.

 Ink print of the right index finger
 Date of birth
 Place of birth
 Height
 Blood type and RH
 Sex
 Date and place of expedition
 Signature of the National Registry
 Barcode with citizen information

Biometrics 
This format includes printing of the right index fingerprint in ink.

White laminated identity card (1952-1993) 
The white laminated card was used from 1952 to 1993, when the brown laminated one was introduced. It has not been valid since August 2010.

Characteristics 

 Material: Paper
 Length: 5.5 cm
 Width: 8.8 cm

Front 

The header consists of the inscriptions "REPÚBLICA DE COLOMBIA" and "CEDULA DE CIUDADANÍA.” The background is white and has the country's coat of arms printed in green ink. On the front face you will find the following information.

 Black and white photo of the person 
 Personal identification number
 Place of issue
 Last name(s)
 First name(s)
 Date and place of birth
 Height
 Skin color
 Signals
 Signature of cardholder
 Signature of the National Registry
 Ink print of the right index finger

Biometrics 
This format includes printing of the right index.

Electoral Certificate 

The "electoral certificate" was issued to people over 21 years of age from February 1, 1935. It is mandatory to present this document for electoral purposes, according to Law 31 of 1929, in all those civil and political acts in which that personal identification was necessary.

Identity card for minors

Sky blue identity card (2014-present) 
This is an identity card issued to minors (those under the age of 18), which can be obtained from age 7. It is only valid for identification purposes and cannot be used to vote, unlike the adult identity card. This is the current format.

Characteristics 
 Material: Plastic
 Length: 5.5 cm
 Width: 8.8 cm

Front 

The header consists of the inscriptions "REPÚBLICA DE COLOMBIA,” "IDENTIFICACIÓN PERSONAL" and "TARJETA DE IDENTIDAD.”  The background, sky blue with orange, consists of curved patterns; has a green/yellow color shift image. On the front face you will find the following information.

 Photo of the person
 NUIP (Número único de identidad personal / Unique Personal Identification Number)
 Last name(s)
 First name(s)
 Electronic signature

Back 

It has no header. The background, the same color as the front, consists of curved patterns, and the emblem of the Registry's Office inscribed in a gray circle. On the back is the following information.

 Digital printing of the right index finger
 Date of birth
 Place of birth
 Blood type and RH
 Sex
 Date and place of issue
 Signature of the National Registrar
 Bar matrix with citizen information

Biometrics 
This format includes digital printing of the right index.

Pink Identity Card (?-2014) 
This version of the identity card for minors was issued until 2014.

Characteristics 
 Material: Paper
 Length: 5 cm
 Width: 9 cm

Front 

The header consists of the inscriptions "REPÚBLICA DE COLOMBIA" and "TARJETA DE IDENTIDAD.” The pink background, consists of patterns of curves. On the front face you will find the following information.

 NUIP (Número único de identidad personal / Unique Personal Identification Number)
 Last name(s)
 First name(s)
 Sex
 Date and place of birth
 Blood type and RH
 Date and place of issue

Back 
The heading consists of the inscription "REGISTRADURÍA NACIONAL DEL ESTADO CIVIL.” The background is white. On the back is the following information.

 Signature of the Municipal Registrar
 Color photograph of the person
 Ink impression of the right index finger

Biometrics 
This format includes printing of the right index.

Identity card for foreigners 
The identity document (cédula de ciudadanía) and the identity card are exclusive for Colombian citizens. There is an identity document for foreigners with long-term visa, the foreigner identity document (cédula de extranjería) issued by Colombia Migration as an identification document. This document allows the exercise of the rights to which the foreigner is entitled on Colombian soil, which are the same as the Colombian citizen, except to vote in elections, and to run for government positions, being able to exercise their vote in municipal, district and council elections if the foreigner in question hold a resident visa.

Foreign Identity Document (documento de identidad de extranjería/cédula de extranjería) 

The foreign identity document is issued by Colombia Migration to foreigners who will reside in the country more than 90 days or have a migrant or resident visa. In specific cases it may be issues to foreigners with a visitor’s visa. This document can be issued to minors from age 7. In this case, the foreign identity document will have the annotation “menores de edad” under the cardholder’s photo. The numbering of the document is sometimes similar to those with citizenship cards and sometimes there are cases in which they have the same identification numbers, which can cause problems due to the duplication of information on Colombian databases.

This document does not provide information regarding place of birth and place of issue. Unlike the citizenship card, the date of issue changes every time the foreign identity card is renewed or when turning 18. Identification numbers on foreign identity cards are assigned based on the Biographical Archive of Foreign Migration Colombia and is assigned as a “historia extranjera” (foreign history) at the time of issuing a safe-conduct or starting any administrative process, or at the time of the individual’s first visa registration by the Foreign Ministry.

Characteristics 
 Material: Polycarbonate
 Length: 5.5 cm
 Width: 8.8 cm

Front 
The header consists of the inscription "COL" (Colombia's acronym for ICAO), "REPÚBLICA DE COLOMBIA" and "Cédula de Extranjería.” The purple background with soft shades of yellow and white, consists of circle patterns, and on the right side it shows the facade of the Casa de Nariño. It has a round hologram on the middle of the document, with the coat of arms of Colombia and the logo of Colombia Migration. On the front face it has the following information:

 Photo of the person
 Type of visa (visitor, migrant or resident)
 Foreigner Identity Document Number
 Last name(s)
 First name(s)
 Nationality (In ICAO acronym)
 Date of birth (In YYYY/MM/DD format)
 Sex
 Blood type y RH
 Issue date (changes with each update) and expiration date
 If the cardholder is a minor, an inscription that says “menor de edad” will be displayed under the photo
 Electronic signature
 Right index

Back 
 Bar Matrix with holder information (it does not have the same structure as that of an identity document with holograms, so it is incompatible in most of the applications that are used)
 Lateral barcode with number for internal use
 Legend in Spanish and English on the duty of the holder to notify Colombian Migration of any change in status or immigration information.
 Signature of the Director of Migration Colombia
 [www.migracioncolombia.gov.co Official website of Colombian Migration]
 Machine-readable zone

See also 
 Identity document
 Colombian passport
 Electronic identification
 German identity card
 Documento Nacional de Identidad (Spain)
 Electronic signature
 Digital signature

References

External links 

 Official website of the Chancellery of Colombia
 Official website of the Registraduría Nacional del Estado Civil

Law of Colombia
Identification
National identity cards by country
Certificate authorities
Identity documents of Colombia
Privacy in Colombia